Joseph Lupo was an Italian viol player and composer active for 40 years or more at the court of Elizabeth I of England.  His brother Peter and their father Ambrose also served as court musicians.  Born in Venice to Ambrose and his first wife Lucia, he and his brother first went to Antwerp (where Joseph joined the musicians' guild on 20 August 1557) before moving to England, where Joseph succeeded another Italian, Paul Galliardello, who returned to Venice in May 1563.  He married Laura, daughter of Alvise Bassano and granddaughter of the musician Jeronimo Bassano (again possibly Italian Jewish), and played at the funeral of Elizabeth I.  His sons Thomas, probably born in London, and Horatio  also became court musicians.

Family tree

External links
Peter Holman, Four and Twenty Fiddlers: The Violin at the English Court, 1540-1690 (Oxford University Press, 1993), page 104-105
The English Royal Violin Consort in the Sixteenth Century
Lanyer: A Renaissance Woman Poet
HOASM: Joseph Lupo
1601 - Private Acts, 43 Elizabeth I: Joseph Lupo

Italian emigrants to the Kingdom of England
16th-century Italian Jews
Renaissance composers
English classical composers
Jewish classical musicians
Year of death unknown
Year of birth unknown
English male classical composers
Lupo family